The One That You Love is the sixth album by British/Australian soft rock duo Air Supply, released in 1981. The album became their most famous and successful in their career. It reached No. 10 in Australia and the United States.

Overview 
The album was released after their major success with their previous album, Lost in Love, and multiplied the band's popularity through the first period of the 1980s. Production was carried out by Harry Maslin, while the project featured Clive Davis as executive producer. The single, "The One That You Love", became the band's first and only No. 1 hit. "Here I Am (Just When I Thought I Was Over You)" reached No. 5 in the US charts, being closely related to the style of Barry Manilow, one of the band's influences. The third single of the album was "Sweet Dreams". Beside the singles, the track "I'll Never Get Enough of You" was used as the main theme of a Japanese TV novel, and became a hit in Asia. This was their first entry into any Asian chart.

Reception
Cash Box said "The group had a wildly successful year in 1980. The One That You Love follows in the same vein as last year's debut with those lifting ballads and helium vocal. Best cuts on this collection of classic adult contemporary fare are 'Keeping the Love Alive' and 'I Want to Give It All'."

Track listing
All songs written by Graham Russell, except where noted.

Personnel 
 Russell Hitchcock – vocals
 Graham Russell – vocals, acoustic guitar
 Rex Goh – acoustic guitar, electric guitar 
 David Moyse – acoustic guitar, electric guitar
 Frank Esler-Smith – keyboards, orchestral arrangements and conductor
 Dave Green – bass
 Ralph Cooper – drums

Production 
 Executive Producer – Clive Davis
 Produced, Engineered and Mixed by Harry Maslin
 Assistant Engineer – Neil Rawle 
 Mix Assistant – Jon Van Nest
 Mastered by Chris Bellman 
 Recorded at Paradise Studios (Sydney, Australia).
 Mixed and Mastered at Allen Zentz Recording (Hollywood, CA).
 Art Direction – Howard Fritzon and Ria Lewerke-Shapiro
 Photography – Leon Lecash and Guy Maxwell
 Logo – Ray Barber

Charts

Certifications and sales

References

1981 albums
Air Supply albums
Albums produced by Clive Davis
Arista Records albums